Aaron Bradshaw Jr. CBE (July 1, 1894 – November 8, 1976) was a highly decorated officer in the United States Army with the rank of major general. A graduate of the United States Military Academy, he is most noted as Anti-Aircraft Artillery officer during the World War II.

Following the War, Bradshaw remained in the Army and served within the logistics assignments including Assistant Chief of Staff for logistics (G-4), U.S. European Command.

Early years

Aaron Bradshaw Jr. was born on July 1, 1894 in Washington, D.C. as the son of lawyer, Aaron Bradshaw and Mary Emma Leech. Following the high school, he received an appointment to the United States Military Academy at West Point, New York, where he was a member of the Class 1917, which produced more than 55 future general officers including two Army Chiefs of StaffJoseph L. Collins and Matthew B. Ridgway. 

He was a member of the class which produced more than 55 future general officers, including two Army Chiefs of StaffJoseph L. Collins and Matthew B. Ridgway. Other classmates include: Clare H. Armstrong, Mark W. Clark, John T. Cole, Norman D. Cota, John M. Devine, William W. Eagles, Theodore L. Futch, Charles H. Gerhardt, Augustus M. Gurney, Ernest N. Harmon, William Kelly Harrison Jr., Robert W. Hasbrouck, Frederick A. Irving, Laurence B. Keiser, Charles S. Kilburn, Bryant E. Moore, Daniel Noce, Onslow S. Rolfe, Herbert N. Schwarzkopf, Albert C. Smith, George D. Wahl, Raymond E. S. Williamson, and George H. Weems.

Bradshaw graduated with Bachelor of Science degree on April 20, 1917, shortly following the United States entry into World War I, and was commissioned second lieutenant in the Coast Artillery Corps. He completed his training and embarked for France, where he joined 3rd Anti-Aircraft Battalion during the air defense of Paris. Bradshaw was later transferred to the 2nd Anti-Aircraft Battalion and participated in the Meuse–Argonne offensive in fall 1918.

Following the Armistice, Bradshaw participated in the occupation of the Rhineland until mid-1919, when he was ordered to England and entered a post-graduate course at the University of Oxford. He later served in a variety of Coast Artillery commands, including with the 59th Coast Artillery Regiment in the Philippine Islands in 1925 and completed the Army Field Artillery School at Fort Sill, Oklahoma.

In August 1936, Bradshaw joined the office of the Chief of Coast Artillery Corps under Major general Archibald H. Sunderland and served as Major and Editor of the Coast Artillery Journal until October 1940. He was then appointed Federal Inspector & Instructor of 7th Regiment, New York National Guard and remained in that capacity until March 1941, when he was appointed Deputy for Administration, Anti-Aircraft Artillery Training Center at Fort Stewart, Georgia. He was promoted to lieutenant colonel on July 1, 1940.

World War II

Following the Japanese attack on Pearl Harbor, Bradshaw was promoted to the temporary rank of Colonel on December 11, 1941 and appointed Deputy Chief of Staff for Training at Fort Stewart. With the upcoming Operation Torch, an Anglo–American invasion of French North Africa, he was ordered to England in mid-September 1942 and assumed duty as Chief of Anti-Aircraft Section, Allied Force Headquarters in London under Lieutenant general Dwight D. Eisenhower.

Bradshaw took part in the mentioned landing in French North Africa in November 1942 and was promoted to the temporary rank of Brigadier general on April 26, 1943. He then served as Chief of Antiaircraft Section, U.S. North African Theater of Operations for two months, responsible for the Anti-Aircraft defense of Allied units in North Africa, before joined the headquarters of newly activated U.S. 7th Army under Lieutenant general George S. Patton in July 1943. For his service during the Operation Torch, Bradshaw was decorated with Legion of Merit.

Following the activation of 7th Army, Bradshaw participated in the Allied invasion of Sicily in July-August 1943 and also held additional duty as Commanding Officer 34th Anti-Aircraft Artillery Brigade. For his service during the Sicily campaign, he received the Bronze Star Medal.

In December 1943, Bradshaw assumed command of 35th Anti-Aircraft Artillery Brigade with additional duty as Commanding General Anti-Aircraft Artillery, French Expeditionary Corps. He served in this capacity during the famous Battle of Monte Cassino in January-March 1943 and then assumed duty as Commanding General, Anti-Aircraft Artillery, U.S. Fifth Army under Lieutenant general Mark W. Clark.

Bradshaw participated in the liberation of Rome, combats on the Gothic Line and Spring 1945 offensive in Italy until the surrender of Axis troops at Caserta on April 29, 1945. His service with 5th Army was awarded with Distinguished Service Medal, Silver Star and second Legion of Merit.

The Allies of the United States decorated with Order of the British Empire, Legion of Honour and Croix de Guerre by France; Czechoslovak War Cross 1939–1945; Order of the Crown of Italy, Italian Medal of Military Valor, Order of Saints Maurice and Lazarus, Papal Lateran Cross and Sovereign Military Order of Malta.

Postwar career

Following the end of hostilities, Bradshaw took command of the 71st Anti-Aircraft Brigade, tasked with disarming the German 14th Army under General Joachim Lemelsen and placing them into Prisoner-of-war camps. 

He was reverted to the peacetime rank of Colonel by the end of December 1945 and ordered to Berlin, Germany, where he served as Deputy Chief of Plans & Operations, Army Service Forces. He was promoted again to Brigadier general on January 24, 1948 and assumed duty as Chief of Plans & Operations within Army Service Forces in Berlin. He was promoted to Major general on April 28, 1948.

Bradshaw returned to the United States in early 1949 and served as Chief of Service Group, Logistical Division, Department of the Army in Washington, D.C. and later as Chief of Service Division, Office of the Assistant Chief of Staff for logistics (G-4), before returned to Europe for duty as Assistant Chief of Staff for logistics (G-4), U.S. European Command with headquarters in Heidelberg. During his postwar service, Bradshaw received two Army Commendation Medals.

Retirement

His tenure in Europe ended in early 1953 and Bradshaw returned to the United States for retirement. He retired from the Army on February 1, 1953, after almost 36 years of active service and settled in his native Washington, D.C.

Major general Aaron Bradshaw Jr. died on November 8, 1976, aged 82, at Walter Reed Army Hospital and was buried with full military honors at Arlington National Cemetery, Virginia together with his wife, Gwendoline D. Bradshaw.

Decorations

Here is Major general Bradshaw's ribbon bar:

References 

1894 births
1976 deaths
United States Army Coast Artillery Corps personnel
Military personnel from Washington, D.C.
United States Military Academy alumni
United States Army personnel of World War I
Recipients of the Distinguished Service Medal (US Army)
Recipients of the Silver Star
Recipients of the Legion of Merit
Commanders of the Order of the British Empire
Officiers of the Légion d'honneur
Recipients of the Croix de Guerre 1939–1945 (France)
Recipients of the Czechoslovak War Cross
Recipients of the Order of the Crown (Italy)
Recipients of the Order of Saints Maurice and Lazarus
Recipients of the Silver Medal of Military Valor
Recipients of the Papal Lateran Cross
Burials at Arlington National Cemetery
United States Army generals of World War II
United States Army generals